Rhodanobacter spathiphylli is a Gram-negative bacterium from the genus of Rhodanobacter which has been isolated from the root of a Spathiphyllum plant from Leuven in Belgium.

References

Xanthomonadales
Bacteria described in 2006